The back hip circle is an element in men's and women's artistic gymnastics. It is usually performed on the uneven bars or high bar, but can also be done on the balance beam. It is a basic skill, and is usually one of the first learned by beginning gymnasts, but also appears as a component of more advanced moves. The back hip circle is first used in level 2 women gymnastics.

On bars, the back hip circle is usually performed in combination with a cast. To perform the skill, the gymnast rests on the bar in a front support. He casts away, returns to the bar, and travels around it, returning to a front support. 

A more advanced version of the back hip circle is the clear hip. In this move, the gymnast still circles backwards around the bar, but does not return to a front support. A clear hip can be linked to a handstand, dismount or release move. 

On beam, the Yurchenko loop and the Teza both end in back hip circles.

External links 

Animation and explanation of the back hip circle
Gymnastics elements